Richie Emselle (24 September 1917 – 16 January 1992) was an Australian rules footballer who played with Melbourne in the Victorian Football League (VFL). Emselle was a regular in the back pocket for Melbourne during their golden run from 1939 to 1941.

References

External links

1917 births
1992 deaths
Melbourne Football Club players
Australian rules footballers from Victoria (Australia)
Melbourne Football Club Premiership players
Three-time VFL/AFL Premiership players